St Bartholomew's Church is a Roman Catholic church in Chorão, Goa, India. The Parish of St. Bartholomeu is made up of the villages of Caraim and the Passo de Ambarim. Its boundaries are the river of Mapusa to its north and west; on the opposite side of the river the parishes of Aldona and Pomburpa; the parish of Our Lady of Grace Church to the South and the river Naroa with the Parish of Pedade on the Island of Divar to its east.

History 
The Church of St. Bartholomeu was built in the year 1569 by the Religious of the Society of Jesus and handed over to the Diocesan Clergy in 1597.

See also 
 Our Lady of Grace Church (Chorão Island)
 Chapel of St. Jerome (Chorão Island)
 Capela de Nossa Senhora da Saúde (Chorão Island)
 Real Colégio de Educação de Chorão
 Chorão

References

Roman Catholic churches completed in 1569
Roman Catholic churches in Chorão Island
Portuguese colonial architecture in India
16th-century Roman Catholic church buildings in India
Roman Catholic churches in Goa